Pichidangui Airport,  is an airport  east-southeast of Pichidangui, a Pacific coastal town in the Coquimbo Region of Chile.

There are hills southeast of the runway.

See also

Transport in Chile
List of airports in Chile

References

External links
OpenStreetMap - Pichidangui
OurAirports - Pichidangui
FallingRain - Pichidangui Airport

Airports in Chile
Airports in Coquimbo Region